Mount Holm-Hansen is a prominent mountain rising to  between the lower David Valley and Bartley Glacier in the Asgard Range of Victoria Land, Antarctica. On its north side sits Bifrost Ledge, a flat benchlike feature that rises to 1,750 metres (5,740 ft).

The mountain was named by the Advisory Committee on Antarctic Names in 1997 after Osmund Holm-Hansen, a plant physiologist, who, working in the 1959–60 season, was one of the first American scientists to visit and conduct research in both Taylor Valley and Wright Valley. Bifrost Ledge was named by the New Zealand Geographic Board in 1998, in association with names from Norse mythology in Asgard Range, Bifröst being a “bridge” linking Asgard (home of the gods) with earth.

References

References

Mountains of the Asgard Range
McMurdo Dry Valleys